The Women's Points Race was one of the 9 women's events at the 2009 UCI Track Cycling World Championships, held in Pruszków, Poland

22 Cyclists from 22 countries participated in the contest. Because of the number of entries, there were no qualification rounds for this discipline. Consequently, the event was run direct to the final.

Final
The Final and only race was run on 29 March. The competition consisted on 100 laps, making a total of 25 km with 10 sprints.

Four riders crashed when Belinda Goss of Australia moved up the banking, Aksana Papko of Belarus veered to avoid hitting her rear wheel but high-sided her bicycle, bringing down two other riders in the process, Pascale Jeuland of France and Olga Slyusareva of Russia who had three points and was placed fifth at the time. The American rider Shelley Olds was lucky not to come down also as she was struck by one of the falling riders but managed to keep her balance, although she later crashed when she was moving down the track at speed, clipping the rear wheel of the British rider Elizabeth Armitstead, Armitstead luckily stayed upright to take the bronze medal behind Yumari González of Cuba. Giorgia Bronzini of Italy won the gold medal, having ridden consistently and featured in all but two of the sprints.

Elapsed Time=32:41.800
Average Speed=45.876 km/h

References

Women's points race
UCI Track Cycling World Championships – Women's points race